Messier 55 (also known as M55 or NGC 6809) is a globular cluster in the south of the constellation Sagittarius. It was discovered by Nicolas Louis de Lacaille in 1752 while observing from what today is South Africa.  Starting in 1754, Charles Messier made several attempts to find this object from Paris but its low declination meant from there it rises daily very little above the horizon, hampering observation.  He observed and catalogued it in 1778.  The cluster can be seen with 50 mm binoculars; resolving individual stars needs a medium-sized telescope.

It is about 17,600 light-years away from Earth. It contains about 269,000 solar masses. As with other Milky Way globular clusters, it has few elements other than hydrogen and helium compared to the Sun. Messier 55 therefore has "low metallicity". This quantity is normally listed as the base 10 logarithm of the proportion of the Sun; for NGC 6809 the metallicity is given by: [Fe/H] = −1.94 dex, whereby −2 would be 100 times less iron than the Sun. This means the cluster has 1.1% of the proportion of the Sun's iron compared to hydrogen and helium.

Only about 55 variable stars have been found in the central part of M55.

Gallery

See also
 List of Messier objects

References and footnotes

External links

 Messier 55, SEDS Messier pages
 Messier 55, Galactic Globular Clusters Database page
 
 

Carina–Sagittarius Arm
Messier 055
Messier 055
055
Messier 055
17520616